Maiko Kano ( Kano Maiko, born July 15, 1988) is a former Japanese volleyball player. She was part of the Japanese team that won bronze at the 2012 Summer Olympics.  Kumi Nakada (the coach of Hisamitu Springs) converted her to Setter in 2012-13 season.

Profiles
She became a volleyball player at 10 years old.
 Miyuki Kano is her elder sister.
She was elected the candidate player of the national team when she was a junior high school student.

Clubs
  Hachiouji Jissen Junior High
  Hachiouji Jissen High School
  Hisamitsu Springs (2007–2010)
  Minerva Volley Pavia（2010-2011）
  Beşiktaş（2011-2012）
  Hisamitsu Springs (2012–2015)
  PFU BlueCats (2015–2018)

Honours

Individuals
 2009 Kurowashiki All Japan Volleyball Tournament Excellent player awards, Best 6

Team
 2007 Empress's Cup -  Runner-Up, with Hisamitsu Springs.
 2008-2009 V.Premier League -  Runner-Up, with Hisamitsu Springs.
 2012 Empress's Cup -  Champion, with Hisamitsu Springs.
 2012-2013 V.Premier League -  Champion, with Hisamitsu Springs.
 2013 - Japan-Korea V.League Top Match -  Champion, with Hisamitsu Springs.
 2013 - Kurowashiki All Japan Volleyball Tournament -  Champion, with Hisamitsu Springs.
 2014 Asian Club Championship -  Champion, with Hisamitsu Springs.

National team 
2011: 4th place in the World Cup in Japan
2012:  Bronze Medal in the Olympic Games of London

References

External links
 Japan Volleyball League - Biography
 Hisamitsu Springs - Biography
 Beşiktaş Official Website

1988 births
Living people
Japanese expatriate sportspeople in Turkey
People from Mitaka, Tokyo
Sportspeople from Tokyo Metropolis
Volleyball players at the 2012 Summer Olympics
Olympic bronze medalists for Japan
Olympic medalists in volleyball
Japanese women's volleyball players
Olympic volleyball players of Japan
Medalists at the 2012 Summer Olympics
PFU BlueCats players